Demens-Rumbough-Crawley House, also known as Hanger Hall, is a historic home built by Peter Demens, located at 31 Park Ave. N., Asheville, Buncombe County, North Carolina. It was built about 1890, and is a two-story, brick Victorian style dwelling on a stone foundation.  It features a low hipped roof, rigid and geometrical exterior ornamentation, and projecting three-stage tower and bay.  Also on the property is a contributing small frame garage.

It was listed on the National Register of Historic Places in 1982.

References

Houses on the National Register of Historic Places in North Carolina
Victorian architecture in North Carolina
Houses completed in 1890
Houses in Asheville, North Carolina
National Register of Historic Places in Buncombe County, North Carolina